The 1929–30 Connecticut Aggies men's basketball team represented Connecticut Agricultural College, now the University of Connecticut, in the 1929–30 collegiate men's basketball season. The Aggies completed the season with an 8–7 overall record. The Aggies were members of the New England Conference, where they ended the season with a 1–2 record. The Aggies played their home games at Hawley Armory in Storrs, Connecticut, and were led by third-year head coach Louis A. Alexander.

Schedule 

|-
!colspan=12 style=""| Regular Season

Schedule Source:

References 

Connecticut
1929 in sports in Connecticut
1930 in sports in Connecticut